Daniil Sergeyevich Avdyushkin (born 1 October 1993) is a Russian football goalkeeper.

Club career
He made his debut in the Russian Second Division for FC Akademiya Tolyatti on 30 May 2012 in a game against FC Nosta Novotroitsk.

He made his Russian Football National League debut for FC Sibir Novosibirsk on 10 August 2014 in a game against PFC Krylia Sovetov Samara.

References

External links
 
 

1993 births
Sportspeople from Penza
Living people
Russian footballers
Association football goalkeepers
FC Sibir Novosibirsk players
FC Spicul Chișcăreni players
Speranța Nisporeni players
FC SKA Rostov-on-Don players
FC Irtysh Omsk players
FC Sokol Saratov players
FC Dynamo Kirov players
Moldovan Super Liga players
Russian expatriate footballers
Expatriate footballers in Moldova
Russian expatriate sportspeople in Moldova